The UNTV Cup Season 4 was the 2015–2016 season of the public service-based basketball league, the UNTV Cup based in the Philippines. It was opened on August 24, 2015 at the SM Mall of Asia Arena, Pasay, as part of the activities for the 11th Anniversary of UNTV Life. Its final games was ended on March 14, 2016 at the Smart-Araneta Coliseum, Quezon City.

BMPI-UNTV Chairman and CEO Daniel Razon, the person who concepted UNTV Cup, together Vice President for Operations Gerry Panghulan and UNTV Cup Commissioner Fortunato "Atoy" Co, led the opening ceremonies, together with acclaimed government officials including Sen. Sonny Angara, Sen. Bam Aquino, Pasig Rep. Roman Romulo and Court Administrator Midas Marquez, followed by the drawing of lots to determine the first teams to compete in the first game.

In the finals, the AFP Cavaliers and the PNP Responders competed in a best-of-three championship series, of which the AFP crowns as the champion. AFP Cavaliers has received 4 million pesos prize (3.5 million pesos for beneficiaries and 500 thousand pesos for the champion team), while the second-placer, PNP Responders has received 2 million pesos prize (1.7 million pesos for the beneficiary and 300,000 for the team). Ten other teams will also receive cash grants for their donors and the team at the end of the season.

Teams
Season 4 is composed of twelve teams divided into two groups.

New Teams 
Ombudsman will be the new team of the tournament starting this season.
 Ombudsman of the Philippines (Ombudsman) Graft Busters

Group A

Group B

Elimination round 
The elimination round began on August 24, 2015 at the Mall of Asia Arena in Pasay. The schedule followed a single round robin format in which all teams faced each other once in their respective group, for a total of five games per team. After the first elimination round, the bottom teams per group are eliminated, and the top four teams per group advance to the second elimination round. After the second elimination round, the bottom two teams are eliminated. The top two teams get outright semifinals spots, while the remaining four teams battle it out on the quarterfinals, with #3 team facing #6, and #4 seed playing against #5.

First round

Group A

Group B

Second round 
The top 4 teams from the two groups will battle for the second round. The teams qualifying in this round will carry over all of the scores and results they earned from the first round. The top two teams after the second round will have an outright berth in the semifinals with a twice-to-beat advantage, while the two bottom teams will be eliminated. In the quarter-finals, the third-seeded team will face the sixth-seeded team, and the fourth-seeded team will face the fifth-seeded team. The third and four seeds hold a twice-to-beat advantage in the quarterfinals.

Playoffs

Quarterfinals

Semifinals
The semifinals games was aired on UNTV on February 14, 2016.

MMDA vs. PNP
MMDA Blackwolves has a twice-to-beat advantage in the semifinal series.

AFP vs. NHA
AFP Cavaliers has a twice-to-beat advantage in the semifinal series.

Battle for Third

Finals
This is the second time that the AFP Cavaliers and the PNP Cavaliers vied for the championship of the UNTV Cup Season 4. In July 2014, both teams competed in a best-of-three finals series, with the Cavaliers taking home the Season 2 championship title.

Finals Most Valuable Player: Boyet Bautista (AFP Cavaliers)

Winners and Beneficiaries

Individual awards 
The individual awards ceremony was conducted during the halftime of Finals Game 2 on March 7, 2016 at the Smart Araneta Coliseum.

Season MVP: Antonio Lustestica, Jr. (NHA Builders)
Finals MVP: Boyet Bautista (AFP Cavaliers)
Mythical Five:
Don Camaso (Judiciary Magis)
Jeffrey Sanders (MMDA Blackwolves)
Boyet Bautista (AFP Cavaliers)
Antonio Lustestica, Jr. (NHA Builders)
Ollan Omiping (PNP Responders)
Best in Scoring: Antonio Lustestica, Jr. (NHA Builders)
Best in Rebounds: Don Camaso (Judiciary Magis)
Best in Assists: Waldemar Tibay (NHA Builders)
Best in Steals: Jonathan Egea (BFP Firefighters)
Best in Blocks: Marvin Mercado (NHA Builders)
Most Improved Player: Samuel Ignacio (Malacañang Patriots)

Final standings

(Based on the quotient system, Malacanañg with a 5-4 win-loss record is eliminated in the second round, together with Senate Defenders)

See also
 UNTV Cup

References

External links 
 UNTVweb.com

Members Church of God International
2015 Philippine television series debuts
2015 in Philippine sport
2016 in Philippine sport
UNTV Cup
UNTV (Philippines) original programming
2015–16 in Philippine basketball
2015–16 in Philippine basketball leagues